George Kynoch may refer to:
 George Kynoch (businessman) (1834–1891), founder of IMI plc, Conservative Member of Parliament (MP) for Aston Manor
 George Kynoch (Kincardine and Deeside MP) (born 1946), Scottish Conservative Party MP

See also
 Kynoch (surname)